The Monteverde Theme Park, previously known as Frog Pond Ranarium, located in Santa Elena, north of Monteverde, Puntarenas Province, Costa Rica, is a frog pond turned animal theme park that houses a butterfly farm with approximately 30 live butterfly species and other insects and over 25 species of frogs and other amphibians from around the country in a climate controlled habitat.

The park includes flowering plants, cascading waterfalls and trees.  There are also several species of free flying "butterfly friendly" birds. There is a learning center where visitors get a close up view of a variety of live caterpillars feeding and developing on their host plants. It also hosts a newly installed 8-cable zip-line through the park's tropical forest, the only zip-line in Costa Rica open at night.

Exhibits

Frog pond 
The frog pond is an indoor exhibit and guided tour of about 28 species. The exhibit is available to visit at night. The snake pond also features select snake displays.

Butterfly farm 
The butterfly farm houses approximately 30 species native to Monteverde and surrounding areas of the cloud forest of the Canton. Some worldwide butterflies are in preserved displays.

See also 
 List of zoos by country: Costa Rica zoos

References

Parks in Costa Rica
Urban public parks
Tourist attractions in Puntarenas Province
Zoos in Costa Rica
Butterfly houses
Insectariums